Days in the History of Silence is a 2011 novel by the Norwegian writer Merethe Lindstrøm. The narrative focuses on an elderly couple who struggles with the inability to talk about sensitive subjects from their past. The book received the Norwegian Critics Prize for Literature and the Nordic Council Literature Prize.

Reception
Silje Stavrum Norevik of Dagbladet wrote: "It is impressive how Lindstrøm composes a small chamber play, and reflects an existence so fragile and delicate without having to resort to big words. ... The language is simple, elegant and pleasant, but the mood so suggestive in its silent drama. Lindstrøm is known as a refined short-story writer, here she shows to the fullest that she also masters the larger canvas."

See also
 2011 in literature
 Norwegian literature

References

External links
 Days in the History of Silence at the publisher's website

2011 Norwegian novels
Norwegian-language novels
21st-century Norwegian novels
Nordic Council's Literature Prize-winning works